Ischyrophaga is a genus of parasitic flies in the family Tachinidae.

Species
Ischyrophaga ischyri (Coquillett, 1905)
Ischyrophaga polita (Townsend, 1919)

References

Exoristinae
Diptera of North America
Diptera of South America
Tachinidae genera
Taxa named by Charles Henry Tyler Townsend